The 2012 Tatarstan Open was a professional tennis tournament played on hard courts. It was the third edition of the tournament and was part of the 2012 ITF Women's Circuit. It took place in Kazan, Russia between 13 and 19 August 2012.

WTA entrants

Seeds

 1 Rankings are as of August 6, 2012.

Other entrants
The following players received wildcards into the singles main draw:
  Elizaveta Kulichkova
  Polina Novoselova
  Alexandra Romanova
  Ekaterina Yashina

The following players received entry from the qualifying draw:
  Nigina Abduraimova
  Mayya Katsitadze
  Marina Shamayko
  Julia Valetova

The following player received entry from a Special Ranking spot:
  Ksenia Palkina

Champions

Singles

 Kateryna Kozlova def.  Tara Moore, 6–3, 6–3

Doubles

 Valentyna Ivakhnenko /  Kateryna Kozlova def.  Lyudmyla Kichenok /  Nadiia Kichenok, 6–4, 6–7(6–8), [10–4]

External links
Official Website
ITF Site

Tatarstan Open
Tatarstan Open
21st century in Kazan
2012 in Russian tennis